 
Year 49 BC was a year of the pre-Julian Roman calendar. At the time, it was known as the Year of the Consulship of Lentulus and Marcellus (or, less frequently, year 705 Ab urbe condita). The denomination 49 BC for this year has been used since the early medieval period, when the Anno Domini calendar era became the prevalent method in Europe for naming years.

Events

By place and Date

Roman Republic 
 Consuls: Lucius Cornelius Lentulus Crus, Gaius Claudius Marcellus.
 Caesar's Civil War commences:
 January 1 – The Roman Senate receives a proposal from Julius Caesar that he and Pompey should lay down their commands simultaneously. The Senate responds that Caesar must immediately surrender his command.
 January 10 – Caesar leads his army across the Rubicon, which separates his jurisdiction in Cisalpine Gaul from that of the Senate in Rome, and thus initiates a civil war. In response, the Senate invokes the  senatus consultum ultimum.
 February – Pompey's flight to Epirus (in Western Greece) with most of the Senate.
 March 9 – Caesar advances against Pompeian forces in Spain.
 April 19 – Siege of Massilia: Caesar commences a siege at Massilia against the Pompeian Lucius Domitius Ahenobarbus. He leaves the newly raised legions XVII, XVIII and XIX to conduct the siege. Decimus Brutus – victor over the Veneti (see 56 BC) – is in charge of the fleet to blockade the harbor.
 June – Caesar arrives in Spain; seizes the Pyrenees passes against the Pompeians L. Afranius and Marcus Petreius.
 June 7 – Cicero slips out of Italy and goes to Thessaloniki.
 July 30 – Caesar surrounds Afranius and Petreius's army in Ilerda.
 August 2 – Pompeians in Ilerda surrender to Caesar and are granted pardon.
 August 24 – Caesar's general Gaius Scribonius Curio is defeated in North Africa by the Pompeians under Attius Varus and King Juba I of Numidia (whom he defeated earlier in the Battle of Utica) in the Battle of the Bagradas, after which he commits suicide.
 September – Brutus defeats the combined Pompeian-Massilian naval forces of the siege of Massilia, while the Caesarian fleet in the Adriatic Sea is defeated near Curicta (Krk).
 September 6 – Massilia surrenders to Caesar, as he is coming back from Spain.
 October – Caesar is appointed Dictator in Rome.

Births 
 Lucius Domitius Ahenobarbus, Roman consul (d. 25 AD)

Deaths 
 January 10 – Xuan of Han, emperor of the Han dynasty (b. 91 BC)
 Aristobulus II, king and high priest of Judea
 Gaius Memmius, Roman orator and poet (presumed).
 Gaius Scribonius Curio, Roman politician
 Jieyou, princess of the Han Dynasty (b. 121 BC)
 Marcus Perperna, Roman politician
 Zheng Ji, general of the Han Dynasty

References